Tony Bove (born in 1955 in Philadelphia, Pennsylvania) is an author, publisher, and musician.  He has authored or coauthored more than two dozen computer-related books and multimedia CD-ROMs, and has served as author and editor of various magazine articles.

Career
Tony Bove wrote the book The Art of Desktop Publishing (Bantam Books, 1986).

He is the cofounder, editor and publisher of Desktop Publishing Magazine, User's Guide to CP/M, and Bove and Rhodes Inside Report (with Cheryl Rhodes).

In 1991, Bove started doing multimedia development on personal computers. His Haight-Ashbury in the Sixties CD-ROM was produced with poet and San Francisco Oracle underground newspaper editor Allen Cohen, featuring music from the Grateful Dead, Janis Joplin, and Jefferson Airplane.

Bove wrote iPod and iTunes For Dummies and coauthored iPad Application Development For Dummies with Neal Goldstein. Bove coauthored The iLife '04 Book with Andy Ihnatko.  He wrote The GarageBand Book, and The Well-Connected Macintosh with Cheryl Rhodes.  He wrote Official Macromedia Director Studio and Adobe Illustrator: The Official Handbook for Designers.

Bove was the editor of Desktop Publishing Magazine, User's Guide to CP/M, Portable Companion (for Osborne Computer Corporation), and Jim Warren's DataCast, as well as a columnist in Computer Currents, Macintosh Today, NewMedia, Publish!, The WELL, The Chicago Tribune, and the Prodigy (online service), and a contributor to magazines including NeXTWorld, Dr. Dobb's Journal, and Whole Earth Software Catalog and Review.

In 2005, Bove wrote the book Just Say No to Microsoft (No Starch Press, 2005), to which John C. Dvorak added a foreword.

Tony Bove is a band member (harmonica, vocals, and songwriting) of the Flying Other Brothers rock band (which included Roger McNamee, Pete Sears, Barry Sless, and G. E. Smith).

Discography
 Haight-Ashbury in the Sixties (1991)

Bibliography
The Art of Desktop Publishing (1986)
Just Say No to Microsoft (2005)
iPod and iTunes For Dummies
iPad Application Development For Dummies
The iLife '04 Book
The GarageBand Book
The Well-Connected Macintosh
Official Macromedia Director Studio
Adobe Illustrator: The Official Handbook for Designers

Reception

Bove's Haight-Ashbury in the Sixties CD-ROM was previewed in Wired. https://www.wired.com/1995/07/truckin-through-the-60s/

Robert Scoble reviewed Bove's book Just Say No to Microsoft, to which John C. Dvorak added a foreword.

Bove's book The Art of Desktop Publishing (Bantam Books, 1986) was reviewed by Erik Sandberg-Diment in The New York Times.

References

External links 

 

Living people
Computer magazine publishing companies
No Starch Press books
History of Microsoft
1955 births
Writers from Philadelphia
American harmonica players
Flying Other Brothers members